Simony is the act of selling church offices and roles. 

Simony may also refer to:

Friedrich Simony (1813–1896), Austrian geographer and Alpine researcher
Simony Hut, an Alpine club hut at the foot of the Hoher Dachstein in Austria
Simonyspitzen, two mountain summits in the Venediger Group of the Austrian Central Alps
Carl Fredrik Simony (1945–1947), Governor of North Greenland
Simony (singer), a Brazilian singer who rose to fame in the 80s as part of child singing group Turma do Balão Mágico and inspired the Netflix series Samantha! (2018)
Antennablennius simonyi, or Simony's blenny, a species of fish

See also 
Simonyi, a Hungarian surname
Simonyi Professor for the Public Understanding of Science
Šimonys in Lithuania